T.J. Power is an Australian actor. He was nominated for the 2014 AACTA Award for Best Actor in a Supporting Role for his role in The Little Death.

Filmography

Film
Resort to Love (2021) - Barrington
OtherLife (2017) - Sam
Halfway (2016) - Josh
The Little Death (2014) - Sam
The Sapphires (2012) - Lt Jensen
Vulnerable (2010) - Craig
Eat Pray Love (2010) - Leon
Wasted on the Young (2010) - Brook

Television
Criminal Minds (2019) TV series - Parris (1 episode)
True Story with Hamish & Andy (2017–18) TV series - Wine guy 1 / Robbo (2 episodes)
Major Crimes (2017) TV series - Cliff Rainier (1 episode)
Offspring (2016–17) TV series - Will Bowen (20 episodes)
Molly (2016) TV mini series - Robbie Weekes (2 episodes)
Checked Out (2014) TV movie - Andy
Parer's War (2014) TV movie - Lieutenant Johnny Lewin
Underbelly: Razor (2011) TV series - Len Jones (6 episodes)

References

External links
 

Australian male film actors
Australian male television actors
Living people
21st-century Australian male actors
Date of birth missing (living people)
Year of birth missing (living people)